The Jakab Hill castle was an early Iron Age castle built as a circular rampart of earth and stone in the Mecsek, on the Jakab Hill, Hungary. The Celtic was situated on the Jakab-hegy overlooking the Drave flood plain. The ruins of a Pauline Monastery is situated within the old ramparts of the castle. The ruins of the monastery, which is located in the middle of the castle, are visible and preserved. The shape castle wall is visible in the satellite images.

History
The largest Iron Age castle of the Carpathian Basin was built at the site of a Bronze Age settlement on the plateau of the Jakab Hill in the early Iron Age. It the most important centre of power in Southern Pannonia before the Roman conquest. It might have been the capital of an Iron Age kingdom, the scope of which could have been somewhere between the Alps and the Danube-Lake Balaton.

Features

The within the main fortification is approx. 300 to 550 by 800 meters. The main fortification has a secondary rampart within it that divided it into two sections, lower part of the 400 x 250-meter contained some sort of "acropolis".

One of the original gates of the castle opens to the west of the acropolis. The other gate is on the south-east side.

In front of the castle, at the site of a former Bronze Age settlement, the graveyard of the Iron Age settlement was discovered, which is still recognizable under the trees of the forest with its stone-laid tombs and the cremation rituals with stone circles surrounding them. The side easiest to approach of the fortress was protected by the highest rampart sections.

Inhabitants

Its inhabitants were the people of the Early Iron Hallstatt culture, and they built the Earth's fortress around 750 BC. Later, around 350 BC it was further modified by the Celts and occupied as the capital of a kingdom until Roman times. The Romans might have forced the inhabitants of the city to leave their town because of their magnitude and good defences, and instead founded the nearby Sopianae, the predecessor of today's Pécs.

Pauline Monastery
The Jakab Hill Pauline Monastery was a Pauline Order Monastery close by Kővágószőlős. It was established in 1225 but during the course of the Hungarian-Turkish wars, it was abandoned like many monasteries in the area. It was restored again in 1736. It was but abandoned again in 1828, and since then its building collapsed, and its walls are mostly just shoulder or waist high. Its ruins were preserved at the end of the 1970s and in 2006-2007. The ruins are open to the public.

Gallery

See also
Heidenmauer (Palatinate)
:de:Ringwallanlage Dünsberg
:de:Alteburg (Biebergemünd)
:de:Höhensiedlung Burg in Schwarzenbach
:de:Ringwallanlage Daubhaus

References

External links

Kővágószőlős towns information of Jakab-hegy
Muemlekem Page for Monastery

Castles in Hungary
Celtic History